Ardekania is a genus of snout moths. It was described by Hans Georg Amsel in 1951 and is known from Iran.

Species
 Ardekania albidiscella Amsel, 1954
 Ardekania farsella Amsel, 1951
 Ardekania sefidella Amsel, 1954

References

Anerastiini
Pyralidae genera
Taxa named by Hans Georg Amsel